The Dana Adobe & Cultural Center or "Casa de Dana" is a historic landmark in Nipomo, California. It was the home of Boston sea captain William Dana, who in 1837 was granted the  Rancho Nipomo in Southern California. Captain Dana hosted figures such as Henry Tefft and John C. Fremont in his Nipomo home, which also served as an important exchange point on California's first official mail route between Monterey and Los Angeles.

The building is listed on the National Register of Historic Places. The entire Rancho Nipomo is listed as a California Historical Landmark.

Gallery

References 

 

The mission of the DANA Adobe & Cultural Center is to engage visitors with the stories of California's Rancho Era History, connecting them with the peoples, the land and its resources to foster environmental stewardship and cultural understanding.

External links 
Dana Adobe Nipomo Amigos

Adobe buildings and structures in California
Museums in San Luis Obispo County, California
Historic house museums in California
Houses in San Luis Obispo County, California
Houses on the National Register of Historic Places in California
National Register of Historic Places in San Luis Obispo County, California
History of San Luis Obispo County, California
1835 in Alta California
Mexican California